Khannur is a village in the southern state of Karnataka, India. Khannur is located in the Navalgund taluk of Dharwad district in Karnataka.

Demographics
As of the 2011 Census of India there were 156 households in Khannur and a total population of 761 consisting of 397 males and 364 females. There were 72 children ages 0-6.

See also
 Dharwad
 Districts of Karnataka

References

External links
 http://Dharwad.nic.in/

Villages in Dharwad district